My Kind of Country is the fifth and final studio album released by American musical duo Van Zant. It was released in 2007 by Columbia Records. It peaked at number 10 on the Top Country Albums chart. The album includes the singles "That Scares Me" and "Goes Down Easy", both of which charted on Billboard Hot Country Songs.

Track listing

Personnel

Van Zant
 Donnie Van Zant – lead vocals, background vocals
 Johnny Van Zant – lead vocals, background vocals

Additional musicians

 Robert Bailey – background vocals
 Pat Buchanan – electric guitar, harmonica
 Tom Bukovac – electric guitar
 Bobby Capps – keyboards
 Perry Coleman – background vocals
 Eric Darken – percussion
 Stuart Duncan – fiddle
 Kim Fleming – background vocals
 Larry Franklin – fiddle
 Kenny Greenberg – electric guitar
 Vicki Hampton – background vocals
 Matt Hauer – electric guitar
 Garry Hensley – bass guitar
 Noah Hungerford – drums
 Erik Lundgren – bass guitar
 Marc Miller – pedal steel guitar
 Greg Morrow – drums, percussion
 Russ Pahl – banjo, dobro, pedal steel guitar 
 Michael Rhodes – bass guitar
 Crystal Taliefero – background vocals
 Russell Terrell – background vocals
 John Willis – acoustic guitar

Chart performance

Album

Singles

References

2007 albums
Van Zant (band) albums
Columbia Records albums
Albums produced by Mark Wright (record producer)